Clovamide is a chemical compound found in cacao. It has only been found in small amounts. It is also found in Trifolium pratense (red clover).

Clovamide can exist as either the cis- or trans- isomer.

In isolated neuroblastoma cells, clovamide has in vitro neuroprotective effects.

See also 
 Rosmarinic acid

References 

Carboxylic acids
Carboxamides
Chocolate